Iftikhar Hussain Arif (born 21 March 1944), is an Urdu poet, scholar and littérateur from Pakistan. His style is romantic Urdu poetry. He has headed the Pakistan Academy of Letters and the National Language Authority. He has received the Hilal-e-Imtiaz, Sitara-e-Imtiaz and Presidential Pride of Performance awards, the highest literary awards given by the Government of Pakistan.

Career
Arif attended the University of Lucknow, then studied journalism at New York University. He then migrated to Karachi, Pakistan, where he was a newscaster for Radio Pakistan. He then joined the Pakistan Television Corporation (Karachi Center) where he teamed up with Obaidullah Baig for the PTV program Kasauti.

He spent the next thirteen years in England, until 1990, working for Urdu Markaz there.

Achievements

Arif has published three poetry collections: Mehr-i-Doneem (1984), Harf-i-Baryab (1994) and Jahan-e-Maloom.

Oxford University Press has published an anthology of his translated poetry, Written in the Season of Fear, with an introduction by Harris Khalique, a poet who writes in English, Urdu and Punjabi.

Awards
Hilal-i-Imtiaz (Crescent of Excellence) Award by the President of Pakistan (2005)
Sitara-e-Imtiaz (Star of Excellence) Award by the President of Pakistan (1999)
Pride of Performance (literature) by the President of Pakistan (1990)
Faiz International Award for Poetry from the Aalami Urdu Conference

Books and publications
Mehr-i-Doneem (1984)
Harf-i-Baryab (1994)
Jahan-e-Maloom (2005)
Shehr-e-Ilm ke derwazay per (2006)
Written in the Season of Fear (English translation)
The Twelfth Man (translation of Barhwan Khilari by Brenda Walker, 1989)
Kitab-e-Dil-o-Dunya (2009)
Modern Poetry of Pakistan (2011)

References

External links
Iftikhar Arif expressing his views on today's poetry.  and then reciting some of his poetry. 29/04/2011

1944 births
Living people
Writers from Lucknow
Muhajir people
Pakistani male poets
Recipients of the Pride of Performance
Recipients of Hilal-i-Imtiaz
Recipients of Sitara-i-Imtiaz
University of Lucknow alumni
Poets from Karachi
Pakistani male writers
Urdu-language poets from Pakistan
Pakistani radio presenters
Pakistani television people